Pseudegalicia tetrops is a species of beetle in the family Cerambycidae, and the only species in the genus Pseudegalicia. It was described by Galileo and Martins in 2001.

References

Hemilophini
Beetles described in 2001